The eyrean ctenotus (Ctenotus taeniatus)  is a species of skink found in Australia.

References

taeniatus
Reptiles described in 1949
Taxa named by Francis John Mitchell